Aleksandr Ryabov may refer to:
 Aleksandr Ryabov (athlete)
 Aleksandr Ryabov (politician)

See also
 Alexander Ryabov, Russian ice hockey player